Peace is a studio album by Jim Brickman released on September 23, 2003. It is a Christmas album and received a Grammy Award Nomination for Best Pop Instrumental Album.

Track listing
 "We Three Kings" – 3:42
 "Hark! The Herald Angels Sing" – 2:42
 "Let It Snow! Let It Snow! Let It Snow!" – 2:45; featuring The Blind Boys of Alabama
 "Early Snowfall" (Jim Brickman) – 3:04
 "Do You Hear What I Hear?" – 4:05; featuring Anne Cochran and Tracy Silverman 
 "Away in a Manger" – 3:45
 "Rejoice (O Come, O Come Emmanuel)" – 3:59
 "O Holy Night" – 3:29
 "Jingle Bells" – 4:21
 "God Rest Ye Merry Gentlemen" – 4:05
 "Sending You a Little Christmas" (Brickman, Billy Mann, Victoria Shaw) – 2:28; featuring Kristy Starling
 "Blessings" (Brickman) – 2:28
 "Peace (Where the Heart Is)" (Brickman, Keith Follesé) – 4:04; featuring Collin Raye

Personnel

Musicians 
 Jim Brickman – grand piano, arrangements (1, 2, 6, 8, 9, 10), backing vocals (5)
 Howard Pfeifer – additional keyboards (3), arrangements (3)
 Billy Mann – keyboard programming (11), arrangements (11), backing vocals (11)
 Chris Rojas – keyboard programming (11), arrangements (11)
 Bruce Watson – guitars (13)
 Jorgen Carlsson – additional guitars (13), bass (13)
 Dominic Genova – bass (3)
 Nick Vincent – drums (3)
 Matt Laug – drums (13), percussion (13)
 David Grow – additional percussion (3), arrangements (3, 7, 13), keyboards (5, 7, 13), backing vocals (5, 13), additional keyboards (12)
 George Purviance – Ethnic percussion (13)
 Joseph Stone – recorder (1), English horn (9)
 Steven Holtman – muted trombone (3)
 Eric Rigler – penny whistle (5)
 Tracy Silverman – 6-string viola (5, 7, 12), arrangements (7), violin (13)
 Ellie Choate – harp (6)
 Peggy Baldwin – cello (13)
 Eddie King – orchestrations (1, 2, 9, 10), arrangements (6)
 Cliff Bemis – vocal conductor (5, 7)
 The Blind Boys of Alabama – vocals (3)
 Anne Cochran – lead vocals (5), backing vocals (5)
 Ken Stacey – backing vocals (5, 13)
 Windy Wagner – backing vocals (5, 13)
 Kristy Starling – lead vocals (11)
 Collin Raye – lead vocals (13)
 Monty Allen – backing vocals (13)
 David Isaacs – backing vocals (13)

The Malibu Lake Holiday Singers (5 & 7)
 Cliff Bemis, David Grow, Phoebe Jevtovich, Ken Stacey and Windy Wagner

Production 
 Jim Brickman – producer (1, 2, 4, 6, 8, 9, 10), piano recording (7), recording (8) 
 Eddie King – producer (1, 2, 6, 9, 10), engineer (2, 4, 6, 9, 10)
 David Grow – producer (3, 5, 7, 12, 13), recording (3, 5, 7, 12, 13), mixing (3, 5, 7, 12, 13), additional recording (7)
 Billy Mann – producer (11)
 Chris Rojas – engineer (11)
 Rod Michaels – assistant engineer (3, 13), music editing (3, 13)
 Ashburn Miller – assistant engineer (3, 5, 7, 12)
 Dave Collins – mastering at Dave Collins Mastering (Hollywood, California)
 Michael Caprio – art direction, design 
 Kevin Merrill – cover photography, studio photography 
 Anne Cochran – winter scene photography 
 Wendy Leonard – winter scene photography assistant 

2003 Christmas albums
Christmas albums by American artists
Jim Brickman albums
New-age Christmas albums